Ding Ning (born 20 June 1990) is a former Chinese table tennis player. She was the winner of women's singles in the 2011 World Table Tennis Championships. 

At the 2015 World Table Tennis Championships, Ding won her second world title in women's singles by defeating her compatriot Liu Shiwen 4–3 in the final. At the 2017 World Table Tennis Championships in Düsseldorf Ding defeated Zhu Yuling 4–2 in the final, becoming World Champion for the third time. She won the women's table tennis singles gold medal at the 2016 Summer Olympics where she beat compatriot Li Xiaoxia in the women's singles final.  She previously won the silver medal at the 2012 Summer Olympics in the women's singles event.  She was part of the Chinese team that won the gold medal in the team event at the 2012 and 2016 Olympics. She is one of the most successful female table tennis players (alongside Li Xiaoxia, Deng Yaping, Wang Nan, Zhang Yining) having won the gold medal in each of the Table Tennis World Cup, the Table Tennis World Championships, and the Olympic Games.

She is currently retired, and studying in Peking University for a master's degree in Physical Education. Ding officially announced her retirement in September 2021.

London 2012 Controversy

In the Olympic Singles final against compatriot Li Xiaoxia, Italian umpire Paola Bongelli repeatedly cautioned Ding for her backhand tomahawk serve . Bongelli deducted 3 penalty points from Ding leading her to break down in tears in the fourth set. The decision from Bongelli affected the game, Ding's composure and her timing, and caused Ding to lose the final. After the game Ding stated, "I had an obstacle today, and not only from the opponent but from the judge as well. I was affected by the judge. After the first one (point penalty), I tried to keep cool but could not hold it after the second. The judge was too strict. I always serve the ball like this. I have done that for the last two years and, even from the first game of the Olympics, I have served like this. I do not know what to say. As soon as I raised my hand to serve, she sentenced me with a service violation."

Career records
Singles (as of 2016)
World Championships: Winner (2011, 2015, 2017)
World Cup: Winner (2011,2014, 2018).
Pro Tour Winner (11): Kuwait Open (2009); English, UAE, Austrian Open (2011); Slovenian, Polish Open (2012); Austrian, Qatar, Russian Open (2013); China Open (2014); Korea, China Open (2016); China Open (2017) Runner-up (4): German Open (2010); Qatar, Harmony China <Suzhou> Open (2011); KRA Korea Open (2012); Kuwait, China, Polish Open (2015); Kuwait, Qatar, Japan Open (2016).
Pro Tour Grand Finals Winner (1): Lisbon, Portugal (2015) appearances: 4. Record: runner-up (2009, 11,12,13).
Asian Championships: winner (2009).
Asian Cup: Winner (2014); 2nd (2010); 3rd (2009).
World Junior Championships: winner (2005).
Olympics : Silver Medal (2012), Gold Medal (2016)
Women's Doubles
World Championships: winner (2017), runner-up (2009, 2011,2013,2015).
Pro Tour Winner (18): Danish, China (Tianjin) Open (2009); Qatar Open (2010); Austrian Open (2011); Hungarian, Slovenian, KRA Korea Open (2012); Austrian, Kuwait, Qatar, Russian Open (2013); China Open (2014); Kuwait, Polish Open (2015); Kuwait, Qatar, Japan, Korean Open (2016); China Open (2017) Runner-up (8): China (Nanjing) Open 2007; Qatar Open (2009); Kuwait, German, China Open (2010); English, Qatar, Harmony China <Suzhou> Open (2011); China Open (2012,16)
Pro Tour Grand Finals appearances: 3. Record: winner (2009,2013,2015).
Asian Games: runner-up (2010).
Asian Championships: winner (2009).
China National Games: winner (2017).

Mixed Doubles
World Championships: round of 16 (2007).
Asian Games: quarterfinal (2010)
Asian Championships: runner-up (2009).
China National Games: Winner (2013)

Team
World Championships: 1st (2012,2014,2016, 2018) ; 2nd (2010).
World Team Cup: 1st (2009, 2010, 2011, 2013, 2015, 2018).
Asian Games: 1st (2010,2014).
Asian Championships: 1st (2009, 2012, 2013,2015).

Olympic 2012
(Byes up to Round 3 as Ranked 1)
Round 3: Beat Daniela Dodean 4–0.
Round 4: Beat Jiang Huajun 4–1.
QF: Beat Ai Fukuhara 4–0.
SF: Beat Feng Tianwei 4–2.
F : Lost Li Xiaoxia 1–4.

Olympic 2016
(Byes up to Round 3 as Ranked 1)
Round 3: Beat Elizabeta Samara 4–0.
Round 4: Beat Doo Hoi Kem 4–0.
QF: Beat Han Ying 4–0.
SF: Beat Kim Song I 4–1.
F : Beat Li Xiaoxia 4–3.

References

External links

1990 births
Living people
People from Daqing
Chinese female table tennis players
Table tennis players at the 2012 Summer Olympics
2016 Olympic gold medalists for China
Table tennis players at the 2016 Summer Olympics
Olympic table tennis players of China
Olympic medalists in table tennis
Olympic silver medalists for China
Table tennis players from Heilongjiang
Medalists at the 2012 Summer Olympics
Asian Games medalists in table tennis
Table tennis players at the 2010 Asian Games
Table tennis players at the 2014 Asian Games
Medalists at the 2010 Asian Games
Medalists at the 2014 Asian Games
Asian Games gold medalists for China
Asian Games silver medalists for China
World Table Tennis Championships medalists
Peking University alumni
21st-century Chinese women